Hamzabeyli is a village in Toroslar district  of Mersin Province, Turkey. (Toroslar district center is a part of Greater Mersin) . At  it is situated along a tributary of Müftü River and has a small waterfall on the river. The population of the village  was 187  as of 2012.

References

Villages in Toroslar District